Duygu Fırat (born July 15, 1990 in İzmir, Turkey) is a Turkish female basketball player. The young national plays for Fenerbahçe İstanbul as center position. Duygu is 188 cm tall and weighs 74 kg. She currently plays for Burhaniye Belediyespor on loan from Fenerbahçe İstanbul where she played since 2005. She also played for Bucaspor in youth level. She played 37 times for Turkey national women's basketball team.

Honors
Turkish Championship
Winners (1): 2007
Turkish Cup
Winners (1): 2007
Turkish Presidents Cup
Winners (1): 2007

See also
 Turkish women in sports

External links
 Duygu Fırat at Fenerbahçe
 

1990 births
Living people
Turkish women's basketball players
Fenerbahçe women's basketball players
Basketball players at the 2015 European Games
European Games competitors for Turkey
21st-century Turkish women